Comfort to the Soul is Ana Popović's second studio album, released on October 7, 2003 on Ruf. The album was recorded in Memphis and produced by Jim Gaines. The album consists of five songs by Popović and six covers, showcasing not just the well-known blues artists (Howlin' Wolf), but lesser known performers (Susan Marshall), and even rock songs that work well in the blues environment (Steely Dan's "Night by Night"). Popović introduced some jazz elements into Comfort to the Soul, and the album won a jazz award in France, 'Jazz a Juan-Revelation 2004'. She surrounded herself with seasoned musicians (such as Reese Wynans who had played with Stevie Ray Vaughan as part of Double Trouble) as a statement that she was a blues player to be reckoned with.

Track list

Personnel

Musicians
 Ana Popović – vocals, guitar, rhythm guitar, slide guitar
 Jack Holder – guitar, rhythm guitar
 Dave Smith – bass
 Susan Marshall – background vocals (tracks 2, 3, 6 & 10)
 Becky Russell – background vocals (track 3, 6 & 10)
 Steve Potts – drums
 Reese Wynans – Hammond (tracks 3, 6 & 9)
 Al Gamble – Hammond, keys (track 2)
 Lyn Jones – harmonica (tracks 8 & 10)

Production 
 Jim Gaines – production (tracks 1, 2, 5, 7 & 10)
 David Z – production (tracks 3, 4, 6, 8, 9 & 11) and mixing
 Karsten Fuchs – mastering at Brühl Studios Weimar, photography
 Michael van Merwyk – artwork

References

2003 albums
Ana Popović albums